Mirko Tremaglia (17 November 1926 – 30 December 2011) was an Italian politician and lawyer. Famous for his youth as a fascist soldier, he was one of the most important exponents of the Italian far-right politics during the "First Republic" Italian period (1948-1994).

Biography
Born in Bergamo, Tremaglia grew up assimilating the ideas of the Italian Fascism in his childhood and adolescence. During World War II he fought, at the age of 17, in the National Republican Guard belonging to the Italian Social Republic, a puppet state controlled by Nazi Germany. In the following months Tremaglia lost both parents and was taken as a prisoner by the Allies, then interned in Coltano prisoner-of-war camp for fascist prisoners.

After the second post-war period, he enrolled at the Catholic University of Milan, but was kicked out of it when his past as a NRG volunteer was discovered. Later he graduated in law then practicing as a lawyer.

He was also a co-founder of the Italian Social Movement in 1946 and of its successor, the National Alliance in 1995. Between 2001 and 2006 he served as Minister without portfolio of Italians in the World in the second and third Berlusconi Cabinet. Under this government he is remembered for the Law 459 of 2001 "for the exercise of the right to vote of Italian citizens resident abroad", known as Tremaglia Law.

In 2008 he joined The People of Freedom, but in 2010 he followed Gianfranco Fini into his new party Future and Freedom. Tremaglia died at his home in Bergamo, after a long distress with Parkinson's disease.

Controversies
Tremaglia found himself at the center of a controversy for defending the well-known anti-homosexuality Roman Catholic colleague Rocco Buttiglione, after 2004 European Parliament election, stating: "Unfortunately Buttiglione has lost. Poor Europe: fags are among the majority government". For this statement Tremaglia was reprimanded and criticized by several members of various parties of the Italian political spectrum.

See also
For Italy in the World

References

1926 births
2011 deaths
Deputies of Legislature VI of Italy
Deputies of Legislature VII of Italy
Deputies of Legislature VIII of Italy
Deputies of Legislature IX of Italy
Deputies of Legislature X of Italy
Deputies of Legislature XI of Italy
Deputies of Legislature XII of Italy
Deputies of Legislature XIII of Italy
Deputies of Legislature XIV of Italy
Deputies of Legislature XV of Italy
Deputies of Legislature XVI of Italy
Italian military personnel of World War II
Italian Social Movement politicians
National Alliance (Italy) politicians
The People of Freedom politicians
Future and Freedom politicians
Government ministers of Italy
Politicians from Bergamo
People of the Italian Social Republic
Neurological disease deaths in Lombardy
Deaths from Parkinson's disease
Italian prisoners of war